Bernard Hopkins vs. Chad Dawson II took place on April 28, 2012. The match was a rematch of their first controversial fight from a year earlier in Los Angeles, California, United States which ended when Hopkins was unable to continue due to a dislocated shoulder suffered when Dawson lifted Hopkins off the ground with his own shoulder, causing Hopkins to the canvas after a clinch. The fight was originally ruled as a technical knockout victory for Dawson in the second round, but was later changed to a no contest by the California State Athletic Commission and a technical draw by the World Boxing Council.

The rematch took place at Boardwalk Hall in Atlantic City, New Jersey, USA, and was televised on HBO as part of its World Championship Boxing series. The rematch was contested for Hopkins' WBC and The Ring light heavyweight championships, both of which were returned to him after the reversed decision.

Undercard
The co-featured contest on the HBO card featured a heavyweight bout between Seth Mitchell and Chazz Witherspoon for the vacant NABO heavyweight championship, which was won by Mitchell via a third round technical knockout.

Fight information
Since neither fighter was able to garner a decision in the previous fight, they entered the contest with the same records they had when they fought the first time. Hopkins' record stood at 52-5-2-1, and counting the first fight he had not lost in his last six fights dating back to his 2008 defeat at the hands of Joe Calzaghe, which cost him The Ring light heavyweight championship he had won from Antonio Tarver. Dawson entered the fight having only been defeated one time, when Jean Pascal beat him for his WBC and International Boxing Organization titles in Montreal, Quebec, Canada in 2010.

Eddie Cotton was the referee for the fight, with Dick Flaherty, Luis Rivera, and Steve Weisfeld as judges.

The bout
In the fourth round of the fight, Hopkins hit the challenger with an accidental headbutt which caused Dawson to begin to bleed from his eye. Later on in that round Dawson again tried to lift Hopkins off the canvas as he had in the previous fight but was unsuccessful.

Although Hopkins continued to inflict damage to Dawson's face, Dawson kept hitting Hopkins and won a majority of the rounds. Hopkins went for a knockout victory which he needed later in the fight, but Dawson held him off and lasted the full twelve rounds.

Result
Dawson won a majority decision victory. Flaherty and Weisfeld both saw him as a 117-111 winner while Rivera scored the fight even at 114-114. Hopkins was not pleased with the loss and stormed out of the ring afterward, saying "let the public judge for themselves" if he won. Dawson called Hopkins a dirty fighter and said that if you could go twelve rounds with him you could go twelve rounds with anyone.

References

Dawson II
2012 in boxing
2012 in sports in New Jersey
April 2012 sports events in the United States
Boxing matches at Boardwalk Hall